Recurvaria intermissella is a moth of the family Gelechiidae. It is found in Brazil.

References

Moths described in 1877
Recurvaria
Moths of South America